India, and Indonesia established diplomatic relations in 1951. Both countries are neighbours, India's Andaman and Nicobar Islands share a maritime border with Indonesia along the Andaman Sea.

The Indian-Indonesian relationship stretches back for almost two millennia. In 1950, the first President of Indonesia, Sukarno, called upon the peoples of Indonesia and India to "intensify the cordial relations" that had existed between the two countries "for more than 1000 years" before they had been "disrupted" by colonial powers.

India has an embassy in Jakarta and Indonesia operates an embassy in Delhi. India regards Indonesia as a key member of ASEAN. Both nations had agreed to establish a strategic partnership. The two countries have significant bilateral trade.

India and Indonesia are among the largest democracies in the world. Both are member states of the G-20, the E7 (countries), the Non-aligned Movement, and the United Nations.

According to a 2013 BBC World Service Poll, 51% of Indonesians view India's influence positively, with 21% expressing a negative view.

History

Archaeology 
South Indian origin rouletted ware at the site of Simberan, Bali has produced a carbon dating of 660 BCE (+/- 100). The population exchanges and intermarriages in the island of Bali between Indonesians and Indians has been archaeologically dated to second century BCE.

Religious ties 
The ties between Indonesia and India date back to the times of the Ramayana, "Yawadvipa" (Java) is mentioned in India's earliest epic, the Ramayana. Sugriva, the chief of Rama's army dispatched his men to Yawadvipa, the island of Java, in search of Sita. Indians had visited Indonesia since ancient times, and ancient Indonesian (Austronesian people) has embarked in maritime trade in Southeast Asian seas and Indian Ocean. The Ancient Indians spread Hinduism and many other aspects of Indian culture including the Sanskrit and Brahmi Script. The trace of Indian influences is most evident in great numbers of Sanskrit loanwords in Indonesian languages.

The name Indonesia derives from the Latin Indus, meaning "India", and the Greek nesos, meaning "island". (due to the similarity of the culture in both regions). The name dates to the 18th century, far predating the formation of independent Indonesia.  During the Srivijaya era, many Indonesians studied at Nalanda University in India.

Indonesia entered its historical period after the adoption of Pallawa script and Sanskrit language from India as evidence in some of earliest inscriptions dated from Indonesia's oldest kingdoms such as the Yupa of Kutai, Tugu of Tarumanagara and historical records of Kalingga. Indianised Hindu-Buddhist kingdoms, such as Srivijaya, Medang, Sunda and Majapahit were the predominant governments in Indonesia, and lasted from 200 to the 16th century, with the last remaining being in Bali.

The Indian Epics — the Ramayana and the Mahabharata — play an important role in Indonesian culture and history, and are popular amongst Indonesians to this day. In the open theatres of the Prambanan in Java, Javanese Muslims perform the Ramayana dance during full moon nights. An example of deep Hindu-Buddhist influence in Indonesian history is ninth century Borobudur and Prambanan temples. Even after the adoption of Islam, the link between two countries remained strong; not only because India has a significant population of Muslims herself. Indonesian Islamic architecture, especially in Sumatra, has been deeply influenced by Indian Mughal architecture, evident in the Baiturrahman Grand Mosque in Aceh and Medan's Great Mosque.

Cultural admiration is not one-sided however, Indians also relate closely to Indonesian culture, especially Hindu Balinese culture. During his visit to Java and Bali in 1927, Rabindranath Tagore, an Indian poet, was so enamored to Bali and said "Wherever I go on the island, I see God". Then 23 years later in 1950, Pandit Jawaharlal Nehru hailed Bali as the "Morning of the World".

India and Indonesia officially opened the diplomatic relations since 3 March 1951. In 1955, Indian Prime Minister Jawaharlal Nehru and Indonesian President Sukarno were among the five founders of the Non-aligned Movement.

Throughout their shared history, most of relations between India and Indonesia were harmonious and peaceful, except during 1965 war with India. At that time, Indonesia offered to provide Pakistan with military help, and 'to seize Andaman and Nicobar Islands' of India so as to distract it from the Kashmir front, eventually mobilising submarines to help Pakistan. A maritime boundary agreement between the two countries was issued in New Delhi on 14 January 1977.

President of Indonesia Sukarno was the first chief guest at the annual Republic Day parade of India in 1950. In the year 2011, President Susilo Bambang Yudhoyono was the chief guest for the same event.

Strategic partnership 

 

India and Indonesia, united by historic cultural ties, have signed strategic partnership agreement to enhance cooperation in the national and maritime security and safety, trade connectivity, infrastructure and economic development. India's southernmost territory of Andaman and Nicobar Islands lies close to Aceh province of Indonesia, an area which is an important global trade route. In May 2018, "Shared Vision of Maritime Cooperation in the Indo Pacific" agreement was signed when Indian Prime Minister Narendra Modi visited Indonesia. Subsequently, Indian Navy and Indonesian Navy have been hosting bilateral "Samudra Shakti" naval exercise since November 2018 including in Java Sea and Andaman Sea. These exercises are an significant enhancement of operational engagement between these two navies after their 2002 "Ind-Indo Corpat" agreement. India and Indonesia are also jointly developing Sabang Deep sea Port, and Indian naval ships have been regularly visiting this port after the signing of the agreement. Several Indian navy ships undertook naval exercises and visits to Indonesia e.g. a destroyer INS Rana in 2002, INS Sumitra in July 2018, INS VIJIT in 2019.

Economic relations 

On 25 January 2011, after talks by Indian Prime Minister Manmohan Singh and visiting President of Indonesia Susilo Bambang Yudhoyono, India and Indonesia had signed business deals worth billions of dollars and set an ambitious target of doubling trade over the next five years.

Yudhoyono's Second United Indonesia Cabinet was announced in October 2009 after he was re-elected as president earlier in the year. The vice-president in Yudhoyono's second cabinet was Dr. Boediono.  Boediono replaced Jusuf Kalla who was vice-president in the first Yudhoyono cabinet.

India also has further economic ties with Indonesia through its free trade agreement with ASEAN, of which Indonesia is a member.

The two countries target to achieve bilateral trade of $25 billion by 2015, with cumulative Indian investments of $20 billion in Indonesia.

Culture 

Historically, Indonesian archipelago was heavily influenced by dharmic civilization of India. For example, Ramayana is a major theme in Indonesian dance drama traditions, especially in Java and Bali.

The cultural ties still continue, with popular Indonesian Dangdut music displaying the influence of Hindustani musics very popular within the people of Indonesia especially middle-class to lower-class people that enjoy the tabla-beat music. Bollywood films and music are also popular in Indonesia. To promote Indian culture in Indonesia, the Jawaharlal Nehru Indian Cultural Centre was established in Jakarta in 1989, featuring a library and providing lessons on Indian culture, as well as promoting art such as Yoga, Indian music and dance.

See also 
 Indian Indonesians
 Ramayana
 Mahabharata
 List of institutions with Sanskrit mottos

Further reading 
Hoadley, M. C. (1991). Sanskritic continuity in Southeast Asia: The ṣaḍātatāyī and aṣṭacora in Javanese law. Delhi: Aditya Prakashan.
Hughes-Freeland, F. (1991). Javanese visual performance and the Indian mystique. Delhi: Aditya Prakashan.
Lokesh, Chandra, & International Academy of Indian Culture. (2000). Society and culture of Southeast Asia: Continuities and changes. New Delhi: International Academy of Indian Culture and Aditya Prakashan. 
 
R. C. Majumdar, Study of Sanskrit in South-East Asia
R. C. Majumdar, Champa, Ancient Indian Colonies in the Far East, Vol.I, Lahore, 1927. 
R. C. Majumdar, Suvarnadvipa, Ancient Indian Colonies in the Far East, Vol.II, Calcutta,
R. C. Majumdar, Kambuja Desa Or An Ancient Hindu Colony In Cambodia, Madras, 1944
R. C. Majumdar, Hindu Colonies in the Far East, Calcutta, 1944, 
R. C. Majumdar, India and South-East Asia, I.S.P.Q.S. History and Archaeology Series Vol. 6, 1979, .
R. C. Majumdar, Ancient Indian colonisation in South-East Asia; History of the Hindu Colonization and Hindu Culture in South-East Asia
 
 The journey of the Goddess Durga: India, Java and Bali  by Ariati, Ni Wayan Pasek, 2016, Aditya Prakashan, New Delhi

References

Further reading
 Van Leeuwen, Bas. Human capital and economic growth in India, Indonesia, and Japan: a quantitative analysis, 1890-2000 (Box Press, 2007).

External links

Embassy of India in Jakarta, Indonesia
Embassy of Indonesia in New Delhi, India
India and Indonesia: A New Strategic Partnership

 
Bilateral relations of Indonesia
Indonesia